Woodhouselee was a railway station on the Crookwell railway line, in Woodhouselee, New South Wales, Australia. The station opened in 1902 with the opening of the line, and consisted of a 100 ft platform on the up side of the line with a loop siding on the down side. It was named after a local resident Mr Woodhouse. The platform was closed in 1974 with the cessation of passenger services and subsequently demolished. The line through Woodhouselee closed to goods traffic in 1984, the loop has been removed but the mainline remains intact.

References

Disused regional railway stations in New South Wales
Railway stations in Australia opened in 1902
Railway stations closed in 1974